Örtülü is a village in the Of, Trabzon, in Black Sea Region of Turkey.

History 
According to list of villages in Laz language book (2009), name of the village is Lazandoz, which means "Laz homeland" in Greek. Most villagers are ethnically Laz.

Geography

References

Villages in Trabzon Province
Laz settlements in Turkey